Kaori Kawazoe (河添香織, born 30 September 1995) is a Japanese racewalking athlete. She qualified to represent Japan at the 2020 Summer Olympics in Tokyo 2021, competing in women's 20 kilometres walk.

References

 

1995 births
Living people
Japanese female racewalkers
Athletes (track and field) at the 2020 Summer Olympics
Olympic athletes of Japan